Sérigné Mourtada Fall (born 26 December 1987) is a Senegalese professional footballer who plays as a centre-back and is the captain of Indian Super League club Mumbai City.

Career
Regarded as a goalscoring defender, Fall became the highest scoring defender in the history of Indian Super League in 2021. Under his captaincy, the club began its 2021–22 season campaign with a 3–0 win on 22 November against FC Goa. Mumbai City finished the season on fifth place and failed to qualify for the playoffs. Ahead of the 2022 AFC Champions League kick-off, the club went to Abu Dhabi for training and defeated Emirati giants Al Ain 2–1 in a friendly match. He appeared in and captained the club's AFC Champions League debut match on 8 April against Saudi Arabian Al Shabab in a 3–0 defeat. In the next match on 11 April, Fall led Mumbai City registered their first win at the AFC Champions League, becoming the first Indian team to win a game in the competition, beating Iraqi Premier League champions Al-Quwa Al-Jawiya 2–1 at the King Fahd International Stadium.

Honours
Moghreb Tétouan
 Botola: 2011–12

Goa
 Indian Super League League Winners Shield: 2019–20
 Super Cup: 2019

Mumbai City
 Indian Super League: 2020–21
 Indian Super League League Winners Shield: 2020–21, 2022–23
 Durand Cup runner-up: 2022

References

External links
 
 

1987 births
Living people
Senegalese footballers
Senegalese expatriate footballers
Indian Super League players
Al-Arabi SC (Kuwait) players
Al Salmiya SC players
Moghreb Tétouan players
Wydad AC players
FC Goa players
Mumbai City FC players
Expatriate footballers in Kuwait
Expatriate footballers in Morocco
Expatriate footballers in India
Association football central defenders
Senegalese expatriate sportspeople in Kuwait
Kuwait Premier League players
Senegalese expatriate sportspeople in India
Senegalese expatriate sportspeople in Morocco
Footballers from Dakar